The  is a constituency that represents Kyoto Prefecture in the House of Councillors of the Diet of Japan. It has four Councillors in the 242-member house.

Outline
The constituency represents the entire population of Kyoto Prefecture. Since its inception in 1947, the district has elected four Councillors to six-year terms, two at alternating elections held every three years. The district has 2,088,383 registered voters as of September 2015. The Councillors currently representing Kyoto are:
 Tetsuro Fukuyama (Democratic Party, third term; term ends in 2016.)
 Satoshi Ninoyu (Liberal Democratic Party (LDP), second term; term ends in 2016.)
 Shoji Nishida (LDP, second term; term ends in 2019.)
 Akiko Kurabayashi (Japanese Communist Party (JCP), first term; term ends in 2019)

Elected Councillors

Election results

See also
List of districts of the House of Councillors of Japan

References 

Districts of the House of Councillors (Japan)